Hazelwood Central High School is located at 15875 New Halls Ferry Road in unincorporated St. Louis County, Missouri, adjacent to the current northeast boundary of Florissant. The school is one of three high schools in the Hazelwood School District (HSD), the others being Hazelwood West High School and Hazelwood East High School.

History

The first Hazelwood High School was completed in 1954, located at 1865 Dunn Road in unincorporated North St. Louis County; this area is also known locally as Spanish Lake. The building is still in use as a school – Hazelwood East Middle School. During the early 1960s, as farmland became subdivisions, more students enrolled in the district and a new high school was needed; the second Hazelwood High School was established in 1966 to deal with the rapid growth of the Hazelwood School District during that time. The first year it held 2515 students who were in the 10th to 12th grades. It was the only high school in the district and it quickly became overcrowded as the "baby boomers" reached high school age. By the mid 1970s, the Central designator appeared in the school's name, followed by East and West, indicating from which portion of the district students lived. In the years leading up to the opening of the new high schools, students were partitioned in 'B', 'C' and 'D', schools. The rapid growth of the district proved too much even for a building of Hazelwood's size, however, and starting in the fall of 1974, the school was forced to split the student body into two shifts, called 'split sessions', with one shift attending from 6:30 a.m. to 12:30 p.m., and one from 1:05 p.m. to 7:05 p.m. Later, overlapping shifts were used with a one-hour stating time change because they could not get 100% of the students in nor out of the building at one time.  In 1977, with the opening of two more high schools Hazelwood East High School and Hazelwood West High School, Hazelwood Central returned to a conventional day schedule.

2000–2001 School Year

By the 2000–2001 school year, Hazelwood Central's population was once again growing, this time in response to increasing subdivision development within the school district, land that had for decades been open farmland or otherwise vacant. By 2005, the student body population was once again approaching 3,000 students and overcrowding was becoming a problem.

2006–2007 School Year

During the 2006–2007 school year, the district announced that it was redrawing the boundaries of the three high schools, effective fall 2008. The net effect of this change on Central is expected to be a reduction in enrollment from nearly 3,000 to approximately 2,500 while increasing the population at Hazelwood West High School.

Notable alumni

 Shane Battelle, former Major League Soccer player
 Kate Capshaw, actress
 Keith English, Missouri state legislator
 Roderick Johnson, professional football player
 LaVena Johnson, soldier who gained notoriety due to the circumstances her death
 Ron Kulpa, MLB umpire
 Jeremy Lucido, photographer/director
 Marvin McNutt, professional football player
 Randy Orton, WWE professional wrestler and 14-time World Champion
 Alex Tyus, American-Israeli professional basketball player, also plays for the Israeli national basketball team

References

External links 
 Hazelwood Central High School

Educational institutions established in 1965
High schools in St. Louis County, Missouri
Public high schools in Missouri
1965 establishments in Missouri
Buildings and structures in St. Louis County, Missouri